The Montreal Stars attempted to win their third Clarkson Cup in franchise history. With the first pick overall in the 2011 CWHL Draft, the Montreal Stars selected Meghan Agosta from Mercyhurst College.

Offseason

CWHL Draft

Regular season

 October 13, 2011: The CWHL participated in two charity hockey games for cancer research at Windsor Arena. The event was called 'Stick It To Cancer' and the Montreal Stars competed with the Toronto Furies in two games on Nov. 26 and 27. The campaign was organized in partnership by the CWHL, along with Breast Ride Ever, a not-for-profit organization. Proceeds from the games benefitted local cancer programs and the Hospice of Windsor and Essex County.
 November 19: the second annual "Game on to beat breast cancer" benefit. The target to surpass last year's donation results was far exceeded. A new attendance record was also set at the game, with over 1,100 fans in the stands.
 December 8: Montréal Stars offered a cheque for close to $15,000 to the Quebec Cancer Foundation
 January 8: About 900 persons came to support the Stars in Fundraiser game. More than $7,000 dollars were amassed during the event.
 January 20, 21 and 22: Montreal Stars played their three home games in front of young girl players and fans from local communities where girls' hockey is in full development. These games were presented in collaboration with local girls' minor hockey associations: Mont-Royal Girls Hockey Association, Montreal Girls Hockey and the Pierrefond Girls Minor Hockey. On Friday January 20, a pre-game ceremony was held to honour the career of Catherine Ward, who grew up in and played minor hockey with Mont-Royal Girls Hockey Association.

Schedule at home

Reference

Awards and honors

During the 2011-2012 season, Meghan Agosta broke the Stars' single season record for points scored, surpassing the previous record of 71 points, for the new record of 80 points with 41 goals and 39 assists in  27 games.

See also
 2010–11 Montreal Stars season
  November 19 2011 Montreal Stars beat breast cancer

References

Montreal Stars
Montreal Stars